Natália Araujo (born ) is a Brazilian indoor volleyball player. She is a current member of the Brazil women's national volleyball team.

Career
She participated at the 2017 FIVB Volleyball Women's U23 World Championship,  and 2019 FIVB Volleyball Women's Nations League.

Clubs

 ADC Bradesco pt (2011–2012)
 Seleção Paulista (2013–2014)
 SESI-SP (2016–2017)
 Hinode Barueri (2017–2019)
 Sesc-RJ (2019–2021)
 Osasco (2022– )

References

External links
 FIVB Biography

1997 births
Living people
Brazilian women's volleyball players
People from Guarulhos
Sportspeople from São Paulo (state)